Torodora invariella is a moth in the family Lecithoceridae. It was described by Francis Walker  in 1864. It is found on Borneo.

Adults are cinereous aeneous (ash-bronze coloured), with the wings rather broad. The forewings have a minute oblique whitish mark on the costa at three-fourths of the length and a pale cinereous line on the base of the fringe. The costa is nearly straight and the exterior border is not oblique, but slightly excavated in front.

References

Moths described in 1864
Torodora